Qerim may refer to:

 Qerim, a village in Gjakova, Kosovo
 Molly Qerim (born 1984), American sports commentator